Kristina Larsen may refer to:
 Kristina Larsen (rower) (born 1978), Australian rower
 Kristina Larsen (soccer) (born 1988), American professional soccer player